The Ivanovo Oblast Duma is the regional parliament of Ivanovo Oblast, a federal subject of Russia. A total of 26 deputies are elected for five-year terms.

Elections

2018

References

Ivanovo Oblast
Politics of Ivanovo Oblast